Hamide Nermin Nezahet Sultan ("praised", "softness, delicate" and "prosperity", 27 January 1923 – 7 November 1998) was an Ottoman princess, the daughter of Şehzade Mahmud Şevket, son of Şehzade Mehmed Seyfeddin and Nervaliter Hanım and Adile Hanımsultan, daughter of Mehmed Kemaleddin Pasha and Naime Sultan.

Biography
Hamide Nermin Nezahat Sultan was born on 27 January 1923 in the Üsküdar Palace. Her father was Şehzade Mahmud Şevket, son of Şehzade Mehmed Seyfeddin and Nervaliter Hanım. Her mother was Adile Hanımsultan, daughter of Mehmed Kemaleddin Pasha and Naime Sultan. She developed bone tuberculosis from a young age which remained throughout her life.

At the exile of the imperial family in March 1924, Nermin settled in Nice, France with her grandmother Naime Sultan, bacause she argued that the couple were too young and inexperienced to care for the daughter. Her parents settled in Egypt, where they divorced in 1928.

Nermin and her grandmother lived in Cimiez. Henri Matisse, one of the most prominent French painters lived in her neighbouring house, and one day he met Nermin, whom he found really beautiful. Matisse requested Nermin to become model for his painting, therefore in 1942 the painting Odalisque Au Fauteuil Noir was published after Nermin's consent. The painting later rose to prominence, and in 2015 it was put on sale for €15 million at Sotheby's auction in London.

During the outbreak of World War II, Nermin and her grandmother settled in Tirana, Albania. She was engaged in Albania, however her fiancé was executed by Albanian communist leader Enver Hoxha. Nermin and her grandmother were then held in Nazi concentration camp, where Naime died. After her grandmother's death, a British intelligence officer in Egypt, historian Lord Patrick Kinross, later brought her to Cairo by a military transport aircraft. She begin to live with her father in the Zamalek district. Farouk of Egypt gave them a salary from Ottoman foundations. However following the Egyptian Revolution of 1952, she again had to leave Egypt, after which she settled in Algeria. Nermin got a job in United Nations and provided social counselling to the refugees. She was active during Algerian War of Independence.

Following the independence of Algeria from France, Nermin moved to Bagnols-sur-Cèze to live with her father Mahmud. After her father's death in 1973, she started to receive his pension. Nermin became penniless after her father's death, and remained bedridden until her death.

Nermin died on 7 November 1998 at a local hospital's ward at the age of seventy five and was buried there.

Ancestry

References

Sources
 

1923 births
1998 deaths
Royalty from Istanbul
20th-century Ottoman princesses